The Canadian Intelligence Corps (C Int C) is a component within the Canadian Armed Forces' Intelligence Branch, consisting of all members of that branch who wear army uniform. Prior to the 1968 unification of the Canadian Forces, it was an administrative corps of the Canadian Army. In 1968, the corps was stood down and folded into the new Security Branch. The Intelligence Branch was separated from the Security Branch in 1981. In 2017 the C Int C title was restored for the army members of the Intelligence Branch.

History
Many Canadians were active in the Intelligence field as early as 1939. Major John P. Page GSO3 (Intelligence) at CMHQ in Ottawa was tasked "to evaluate Intelligence and consider how to promote the idea that the Canadian Army should form its own Canadian Intelligence Corps (C Int C)." His proposals were initially refused or set aside and it was not until 29 October 1942 that Canadian Army Intelligence was officially recognized as a Corps.

The initial elements of the Intelligence Corps included the "Intelligence Sections at HQ First Canadian Army, I Canadian Corps; 1st, 2nd and 3rd Infantry Divisions, 5th Armoured Division; No. 1 and No. 2 Canadian Special Wireless Sections Type B; seven Field Security Sections (Army, Nos. 1,2,3,7,11,12); I9X at CMHQ" and the Intelligence "Pool." Additional field Units were in service in Canada, such as the "Security Intelligence Sections at the Districts."

With the formation of the First Canadian Army in Europe on 6 April 1942 and II Canadian Corps on 14 January 1943, additional Intelligence staff were required and in due course added to the Canadian military establishment. Intelligence staff duties at CMHQ also continued to expand, as it became the clearinghouse for all security-clearance cases initiated in Canada and investigated in Britain.

To facilitate cooperation "throughout the period of hostilities, personnel in the Canadian Intelligence Corps formed part of the Canadian Army Staff in Washington and worked in close co-operation with the Intelligence Staff of the United States War Department." They were linguists for the most part, proficient in German, Japanese and many other foreign languages.

Canada's Naval and Air Intelligence Staffs were equally busy fighting the war. Canadian Naval Intelligence officers studied German naval telecommunications, exchanging through 1943 for example, a daily U-boat Situation Report. (See John B. McDiarmid) Special Intelligence from the UK was also provided to Ottawa and Washington. The level of cooperation between the three nations and their Naval Intelligence (NI) organizations was extremely close and both the American and Canadian officers paid visits to the Senior British Naval Intelligence Officer. All three nations promulgated the processed information to ships and commands within their zone of control. The UK recorded that formal integration of the three nation's NI staffs was never necessary, because the Anglo-American organization worked as one against the U-boat threat.

Throughout the war, foreign radio messages were being intercepted by Canadian Army, the Royal Canadian Navy (RCN), Air Force (RCAF) and Department of Transport Radio Division stations, located in places such as Forest (and later Winnipeg), Manitoba and, Point Grey, British Columbia. Following the collapse of France in 1940, the RCN continued to monitor French naval frequencies at Britain's request in order to determine the fate of the French fleet. German communications intercepted by the Canadians also "helped the British in mounting" their "successful attack on" the famous battle-cruiser "Bismarck" in May 1941.

In May 1943, as well as receiving the Intelligence summaries issued by the Admiralty in Whitehall to the naval commands at home and overseas, the (radio interception) Tracking Room in Ottawa began to receive a full series of Enigma decrypts. The material allowed Ottawa to carry on a completely free exchange of communications by direct signal link with the Tracking Room in the Operational Intelligence Centre (OIC). The results were such that, "Canadian...intercept stations and Direction Finding (DF) organizations...made an indispensable contribution to the Allied North Atlantic SIGINT network."

The Intelligence Staffs of both the First and Second Canadian Infantry Divisions in England and other newly inducted C Int C personnel in theatre, continued to be sent to British Intelligence Schools for advanced training. On conclusion of their courses, they were attached to the Intelligence staffs of some of the more experienced British formations, while British Intelligence officers filled their places in the Canadian Army temporarily. As the Canadians became more proficient, they gradually replaced their British colleagues. By 1943, (most of) the Intelligence appointments in the First Canadian Army were filled by Canadian personnel. There was a War Intelligence School where courses were given to officers who had been selected for Intelligence duties in Canada.

C Int C personnel were included in the organizations of "1st Canadian Division and 1st Canadian Armoured Brigade (1 Cdn Armd Bde)." These "were the first Canadian formations to embark on a regular campaign during the war from the landings in Sicily in 1943" and through the fighting in both "Sicily and Italy." Shortly afterwards, "I Canadian Corps went to Italy and took part in the fighting there" along "with 5th Canadian Armoured Division." More C Int C casualties were added in the Mediterranean Theatre, when Cpl A.D. Yaritch was killed while on duty in the Adriatic. Intelligence operations continued in this theatre until all of the "Canadian Mediterranean Force moved to Belgium in 1945" and then went back "into action in Holland." In North West Europe, C Int C Sgt G.A. Osipoff and Sgt F. Dummer were killed during operations in France.

In London, Canadian Intelligence Corps staff officers formed part of the group assisting the First Canadian Army Planning Staff. They studied the role the Canadians were to play and assisted in the collation of the voluminous amounts of Intelligence detail, which poured into London from every conceivable source. This information was carefully sifted, examined, analyzed and, if corroborated by similar information provided by other recognized sources, was recorded and passed to the Operations Branch of the Planning Staff to consider what effect the data might have on the overall plan. The innumerable sources and agencies included refugees from Axis occupied countries, members of the various resistance groups, Allied personnel dropped by air into enemy held countries who then transmitted their information by portable wireless sets, raids conducted on the French coast for a specific purpose, air photographs, neutral newspapers, mail censorship, air reconnaissance, interception of enemy wireless radio broadcasts and countless others. All of this effort was directed towards the one object of finding out as much as possible about the enemy, weather and terrain that would be encountered by the assaulting allied forces. Details concerning German Troop Strength, their defences, their armaments, administrative and supply systems, general strengths, dispositions, state of morale, fighting ability, personality studies concerning characteristics of enemy commanders, the German military state of preparedness, and reinforcement capabilities.

During all this planning activity at staff level, the training of Intelligence personnel with field formations and Units continued unabated. The Intelligence Corps staff devoted considerable time and effort during the pre-invasion period conducting a massive "background study" into the organization of the German Army, its weapons, tactics, equipment, civil administration and Party organization, the language, the country and its people. Anything and everything that was considered useful and helpful towards completing the preparation of the invasion plans was actioned. The intensity with which this preparation was undertaken bore fruit, as evidenced by the tactical surprise which the actual assault achieved. During an interrogation after the battle, General-Field Marshal Gerd von Rundstedt, the Commander-in-Chief of Germany's Army Group West during the Normandy invasion, revealed that although he had expected the invasion to occur daily from March 1944, he had not been prepared to oppose the landings where they actually took place.

Many C Int C personnel went into Europe with the "3rd Canadian Infantry Division (3 Cdn Inf Div) under I British Corps" when it "landed in Normandy on D-Day." Subsequently, additional Intelligence staff with the "II Canadian Corps (II Cdn Corps)" participated in the operations at Caen while "under the command of the 2nd British Army." From 23 July 1944, senior C Int C staffs worked in the "Headquarters of the First Canadian Army, which was at that time in command of both British and Canadian Corps composed of a great variety of Allied forces."

Intelligence coordination and passage of information between the British and Canadian formations was successfully conducted at all levels of command. It was essentially uniform in substantial matters because Intelligence at Eighth Army and within 21 Army Group was inspired by the direction of Brigadier E.T. Williams, CBE, DSO, Field Marshal Montgomery's chief Intelligence Officer in Africa, Sicily, Italy and North West Europe.

The Intelligence organization within First Canadian Army was centralized in the GSO 1 Intelligence. He had no direct relationship to the Director of Military Intelligence in Canada. Any requests or observations, which he had with regard to Intelligence matters, he passed to the DDMI and CMHQ who alone dealt with Canada. On several occasions during the war, HQ First Canadian Army was visited by the DMI and other officers from Canada but they exercised no control over the operational Intelligence within the Army which was entirely the concern of 21 Army Group and the Intelligence Staff Officers at various levels.

1942, Formation of the Canadian Intelligence Corps
The Department of National Defence – Army - issued an order from Ottawa on 6 November 1942, granting authority, effective 29 October 1942, for the formation of a Canadian Intelligence Corps.

Canada-US Intelligence sharing became a practical necessity at the tactical level. In the Brigade-sized combined Canada-United States First Special Service Force (FSSF), which operated in Kiska and in Italy for example, the Unit Intelligence Officer was Major R.D. Burhans, an American, throughout the unit's World War II service. Capt Robert D. Burhans had worked in the Army Intelligence Section in Washington before being promoted and becoming the FSSF G2 in July 1942. His Intelligence Assistant was Lt Finn Roll, also an American.

1944-1945, Canadian Army Intelligence in North West Europe
Once the Canadian Army was "firmly established in France," its Intelligence Corps personnel made good use of "the principles they had learned in England, North Africa, Sicily and Italy." They achieved effective results "during the Canadian Army's drive through Belgium and South Holland in December 1944," and on into Germany in 1945.

As the Allied armies advanced eastward through France, groups of "stay-behind" enemy agents were rapidly ferreted out from their places of concealment and, if of French nationality, turned over to the French for examination and trial. Caches of explosives that had been prepared and stored or set in place to destroy key points, facilities, infrastructure, personnel, and equipment, were retrieved from underground storage vaults and rendered harmless. So effective were these efforts, that instances of sabotage were few and isolated. Other branches of Intelligence were similarly active.

"Captured enemy personnel and material were subjected to" a "thorough search, examination" and Interrogation in order to provide a current data base that would "keep pace with the ever changing enemy order of battle and improvements in weapons and equipment." German radio messages were intercepted and decoded. The Intelligence gleaned by C Int C staffs enabled them to gain an accurate indication of changes in the identity of enemy formations facing them. These indications were supported by all available sources and agencies, including debriefing reports provided "from Canadian reconnaissance patrols, tactical air reconnaissance pilots, air photographs, as well as captured documents" and enemy equipment (CED & CEE). (No. 2 Canadian Special Wireless (SW) Section for example, operated from a Bedford truck under Major R.S. Grant as it fought its way towards and into Germany). All collected information was carefully processed and examined for useful information and then disseminated to the decision makers for further direction using the "Intelligence Cycle" process.

The one occasion when the Canadian Army found itself on the defensive came in December 1944. The Germans launched an offensive in the Ardennes, with the object of seizing the River Meuse and the capture of Liege to prevent the Allies from mounting an attack in the Aachen sector. Scattered along the length of the Lower Maas, from Nijmegen in the East to Walcheren Island in the West, elements of the Canadian Army were deployed to guard the Allies' northern flank. Threat of attack from this quarter became more apparent hourly as evidenced in reports reaching Canadian Intelligence. Enemy activity along the north bank of the Lower Maas involved mass movement of formations, the erection of rafting sites and barges, and vast numbers of recently positioned gun emplacements were clear indications to Intelligence that an attack from this direction, combined with the one already in progress in the Ardennes, was imminent. As a result, formations of the Canadian Units were re-deployed to meet the attack, which was later revealed to have been directed at Antwerp but cancelled due to the failure of German forces in the Ardennes to reach their objectives.

"After the defeat of the German armies, personnel of the C Int C" remained in Germany to assist in "the liquidation of the German Intelligence Services, the disbandment of the Nazi party in all its manifestations and the de-Nazification of German institutions." Similar activity took place "in Holland where large German forces whose escape to Germany had been cut off by the Canadians were "screened." Those whose names appeared on specially prepared "lists" were arrested and held for trial."

Cooperation with American and British agencies took place in many forms and it included the fight against the threat of biological warfare. According to U.S. Army Col Murray Sanders, a highly qualified bacteriologist with the U.S. Chemical Warfare Service (CWS) at Camp Detrick in Maryland, "the cooperation [with Britain and Canada], the sharing of discovery and conjecture was total...we were more cautious with the French and we told the Soviets nothing."

By "the end of the war, the Intelligence Corps was several hundred strong and its personnel were scattered throughout the world." Many of its members had been seconded to British and American organizations and were employed in a wide variety of activities including clandestine operations in Europe and Asia. Intelligence Corps specialists also assisted in interrogation and document research during and after the surrender of Japan.

The contributions of the Intelligence Corps to the security of Canada, however, did not cease with the end of the Second World War. After the war and amalgamation in 1968, the corps became part of the new Canadian Forces Security Branch, and became involved in Signals Intelligence.

Allies
The Corps is Allied with the British Army's Intelligence Corps.
The Corps also enjoys close relationships with the other Intelligence Corps of the Commonwealth, especially New Zealand and Australia, and also those of the United States of America.

References

 Hahn, Major J. E. The Intelligence Service Within the Canadian Corps 1914-1918 Macmillan, Toronto, 1930.
 Harold Skarup, Out of Darkness, Light: A History Of Canadian Military Intelligence - Volume 1: From Pre Confederation to 1982, iUniverse, 2006. There is also Volume 2, 1983–1997, and Volume 3, 1998–2005.

Administrative corps of the Canadian Army
Army units and formations of Canada in World War II
Nationstate regiments/corps of military intelligence
Military units and formations established in 1942
Military units and formations disestablished in 1968
Canadian Armed Forces personnel branches